Events from the year 1675 in Denmark.

Incumbents
 Monarch – Christian V

Events
 22 June  The Royal Danish Academy of Surgery is founded as a replacement for the old Theatrum Anatomico-chirurgicum.

Births
25 March – Prince Christian of Denmark  (died 1695 in Germany)

Deaths

 20 May – Vitus Bering, historian (born 1617)
5 November – Cort Adeler, naval officer, admiral (born 1622).

References

 
Denmark
Years of the 17th century in Denmark